Converse University is a private university in Spartanburg, South Carolina. It was established in 1889 by a group of Spartanburg residents and named after textile pioneer Dexter Edgar Converse. It was originally a women's college but now admits men and women to its undergraduate college and its graduate, online, and summer programs.

History

Converse College opened on October 1, 1890, with a student body of 168 women and 16 faculty members. The college only admitted women students and operated as a "stock company" with the board of directors composed entirely of residents of Spartanburg. Dexter Edgar Converse, a native of Vermont who had settled in Spartanburg before the American Civil War and had become a successful pioneer in the cotton mill industry, served as the head of the first board of directors. On January 2, 1892, fire destroyed the college's main building. The building was enlarged during its reconstruction. In 1896, the college was incorporated in South Carolina and a self-perpetuating board of trustees was named. In 1964, the college introduced graduate programs.

The Converse College Historic District was listed on the National Register of Historic Places in 1975. It encompasses eight contributing buildings dated between 1891 and 1915. They are the Main Building (Wilson Hall) (1892), Annex (Pell Hall, 1891), Twichell Auditorium (1898–1899), Carnegie Library (1905), Cleveland House (c. 1905), Judd Science Hall (1915), Dexter Hall (1899) and Towne House (1898). The buildings are representative of the Romanesque Revival, Gothic Revival, and Neo-Classical styles.

The college changed its name to "Converse University" in the summer of 2021. The college also "expanded its undergraduate residential program from single-gender to co-ed" by admitting male undergraduate students in the fall of 2021.

Presidents

Academics
Converse University has an undergraduate enrollment of about 750 students and a graduate enrollment of about 645 students.

The academic programs are organized in the following departments:
Art and Design
Biology, Chemistry and Physics
Economics, Accounting and Business
Education
English/Creative and Professional Writing
Languages, Cultures and Literature
Health and Physical Education
History and Politics
Mathematics and Computer Science
Psychology
Religion and Philosophy
Theater and Dance
Music

Athletics
Converse athletic teams are known as the Valkyries. The university is a member of the Division II level of the National Collegiate Athletic Association (NCAA), primarily competing in the Conference Carolinas.

Women's sports include acrobatics and tumbling, basketball, cross country, equestrian, field hockey, lacrosse, soccer, softball, track and field (indoor and outdoor), golf, tennis, swimming and volleyball.

The inaugural men's sports are basketball, cross country, soccer, tennis, track and field (indoor and outdoor) and volleyball. Converse's equestrian program is coeducational, though only women participate in NCAA-recognized competition. The university also has a coeducational varsity esports team.

Notable alumnae
Julia Peterkin, class of 1896 and winner of the Pulitzer Prize in 1929.
Kimilee Bryant, Broadway actress and Miss South Carolina 1989 
Lynette Eason, Christian novelist and teacher
Sutton Stracke '93, socialite and television personality

Notable faculty
Julia Klumpke, concert violinist and composer
Radiana Pazmor, contralto and music therapist

References

External links

 
 Official athletics website
 History and Photos – Converse College, Spartanburg, S.C.

Private universities and colleges in South Carolina
Former women's universities and colleges in the United States
Educational institutions established in 1889
Universities and colleges accredited by the Southern Association of Colleges and Schools
Education in Spartanburg County, South Carolina
Buildings and structures in Spartanburg, South Carolina
1889 establishments in South Carolina
Conference Carolinas schools
Historic districts on the National Register of Historic Places in South Carolina
University and college buildings on the National Register of Historic Places in South Carolina
Romanesque Revival architecture in South Carolina
Gothic Revival architecture in South Carolina
Neoclassical architecture in South Carolina
National Register of Historic Places in Spartanburg, South Carolina